The Very One Stakes is a Grade III American Thoroughbred horse race for fillies and mares that are four years or older run over a distance of  miles on the turf held annually in late February or early March at Gulfstream Park, Hallandale Beach, Florida.  The event currently carries a purse of $150,000.

History 
The race was inaugurated on 10 May 1987 and was run as The Very One Handicap over a distance of one mile.

The event was named after the winning mare The Very One who won 22 races in her career including the Grade I Santa Barbara Handicap. The event was not held in 1988 and 1989.

The event was upgraded to Grade III in 1996. 

The event was predominantly run at  miles but was shortened to the current distance of  miles in 2016.
The distance of the event was returned back to  miles in 2022.

Records
Speed record: 
 miles — 1:51.40  Suffused (GB) (2017)
 miles — 2:11.71  Honey Rider (2005)

Margins:
 lengths — Bungalow (1992)

Most wins:
 2 – Holy Helena  (2018, 2019)

Most wins by a jockey
 5 – Jerry D. Bailey (1990, 1994, 1996, 2001, 2002)

Most wins by a trainer
 7 – Christophe Clement (1998, 1999, 2001, 2002, 2007, 2008, 2015)

Most wins by an owner
 2 – Juddmonte Farms (2013, 2017)
 2 – Stronach Stables (2018, 2019)

Winners

Legend:

 
 

Notes:

See also
List of American and Canadian Graded races

External links
 2020–21 Gulfstream Park Media Guide

References

Horse races in the United States
Graded stakes races in the United States
1987 establishments in Florida
Recurring sporting events established in 1987
Horse races in Florida
Flat horse races for four-year-old fillies
Grade 3 stakes races in the United States
Turf races in the United States
Hallandale Beach, Florida